Sharad Joshi was an Indian poet, writer, satirist and a dialogue and scriptwriter in Hindi films and television. He was awarded the Padma Shri in 1990.

Biography

Early life and education
Sharad Joshi was born on 21 May 1931 in Ujjain, Madhya Pradesh to Sriniwas and Santi Joshi, a second child in the family of two sons, and four daughters. Sharadop writing in his childhood.

Family
In the late 1950s, when Sharad Joshi was writing for newspapers and radio in Indore, he met and married Irfana Siddiqi (later Irfana Sharad). She was a writer, radio artiste and a theater actress from Bhopal. The couple had three daughters: Bani, Richa and Neha Sharad. Neha Sharad is an actress and poet.

Career

Essays and plays
Sharad Joshi has written many satirical essays on political, social, cultural and economical topics, such as Atha Shri Ganeshaya Namah, Billiyon ka Artha Shastra, Buddhijivi, Sahitya ka Mahabali, Adhyaksha Mahodaya.

Sharad Joshi also wrote satirical plays. His plays Ek Tha Gadha Urf Aladad Khan and Andhon Ka Haathi are popular for satire and timeless humour

His books and essay collections include Parikrama, Kisi Bahane, Tilasm, Jeep par Sawar Illian, Raha Kinare Baith, Meri Shreshth Rachnaye, Dusri Satah, Yatha Sambhav, Yatra Tatra Sarvatra, Yatha Samay, Ham Bhrashtan ke Bhrasht Hamare, and Pratidin

Filmography as dialogue writer
 Kshitij (1974)
 Chhoti Si Baat (1975)
Shyam Tere Kitne Naam (1977)
 Saanch Ko Aanch Nahin (1979)
 Godhuli (1977)
 Chorni (1982)
 Utsav (1984)
 Mera Damad (1990)
 Dil Hai Ki Manta Nahin (1991)
 Udaan (1997)

TV serials

 Yeh Jo Hai Zindagi (1984–85)
 Vikram Aur Betal
 Wah Janaab (1984)
 Daane Anar Ke
 Shrimatiji
 Sinhasan Battisi
 Yeh Duniyan Gazab Ki
 Pyale Mai Toofan
 Guldasta
 Lapataganj (2009)

Legacy

Madhya Pradesh government has instituted an award in his memory titled, "Sharad Joshi Samman", given each year to individuals for outstanding achievement in the field of writing. It includes a cash award of Rs. 51,000 and citation.

His daughter Neha Sharad also organized Shradotsav in 2016, a literary and theatre festival (which has plays as well as a book fair), to commemorate her father's work.

See also

 Hindi Literature

References

External links
 Sharad Joshi, website
 

Hindi-language writers
Indian male dramatists and playwrights
Indian satirists
1931 births
1991 deaths
Hindi-language poets
Recipients of the Padma Shri in literature & education
Indian humorists
20th-century Indian poets
20th-century Indian dramatists and playwrights
Indian male screenwriters
Indian television writers
Indian male poets
Poets from Madhya Pradesh
Screenwriters from Madhya Pradesh
20th-century Indian male writers
Male television writers
20th-century Indian screenwriters